George Lyndon Carpenter (20 June 1872 – 9 April 1948) was the 5th General of The Salvation Army (1939–1946).

Biography 
George Lyndon Carpenter was born in Millers Forest, New South Wales, on 20 June 1872. His father, Tristan de Acunha Carpenter, was a farmer and a Methodist. His mother, Hannah Carpenter, née Worboys, was English and a Salvationist. George was their only son; the couple had five daughters as well. 

Carpenter trained in Raymond Terrace, Australia, and became an officer of the Army in 1892. For the first 18 years of his officership, he worked in property, training and literary work in Australia.

He and Ensign Minnie Rowell were married on 21 June 1899. She wrote such books as Commissioner Lawley,  Notable Officers of The Salvation Army and Women of the Flag, among others.

In 1911, George was called up to International Headquarters. He became the literary secretary of The Salvation Army under General Bramwell Booth. He served in this role until 1927. From 1927 to 1933, he was called back for further service in Australia, to take over the ranks as Chief Secretary of Australia Eastern Territory. In 1933, he became South America East Territorial Commander. In 1937, he became Territorial Commander of Canada, and served at that post until he was elected General by the High Council in 1939.

His term in office as the General of The Salvation Army was during some trying times. World War II was going on in Europe, but he was a strong leader. He retired as General 26 June 1946.

His books include Keep the Trumpets Sounding and Banners and Adventures.

General George Carpenter died in Earlwood, New South Wales, on 9 April 1948, at the age of 75. He is buried in the Rookwood Cemetery.

References

http://www.salvationarmy.org.au/about-us/history-and-heritage/generals/general-albert-orsborn.html?s=1001
http://www.salvationarmy.org.au/action/NOTEMPLATE?s=0,pURL=general-george-carpenter,

1872 births
1948 deaths
Australian Salvationists
Christian writers
Salvation Army officers